Kisah Kaisara is a 2007 Malaysian teen drama television series produced by Aziz M. Osman. The premise of the series focuses on teenage secondary school girl named Kaisara, whom studied at SMK Yaacob Latif, Kuala Lumpur. The series was premiered from October 30, 2007 and concluded on September 23, 2009 on TV3 and TV9 with a total of 3 seasons and 39 episodes.

During its initial television run, the series was rated among top 5 Malaysia's most-watched TV program in 2007 with 3.5 million viewers and has gained a huge following, especially amongst teenage girls. The series was sponsored by Kotex. A webisode based on the series was launched in July 2010 with 15 minutes per episode. It also available for online streaming on TV3's official YouTube channel.

Cast

Main characters
 Sari Yanti as Kaisara (Seasons 1–3)
 Nabila Nasir as Yanie (Season 1)
 Wan Sharmila as Amy (Seasons 1–3)
 Elliza Razak as Dania (Seasons 1–3)
 Farid Irwan Baharin as Aben (Seasons 1–2)
 Aeril Zafrel as Andi (Season 1)
 Faizul Hafiz as Haris (Season 2-3)
 Faralyna Idris as Hana (Season 2-3)
 Reza Syafiq as Shahrin (Season 3)
 Ayu Shuhada as Julie (Season 3)

Supporting cast
 Norman Hakim as Hasnor 
 Yasmin Haron as Marlia (replaced by Nor Aliah Lee for Season 2)
 Zarina Zainuddin as Teacher Jasmin
 Catriona Ross as Seri
 Finie Don as Janet
 Norisz Ali as Kak Tinaz
 Zoey Rahman as Azmeer
 Nadia Kesumawati as Teacher Ramlah
 Kismah Johar as Grandma

Episodes

Season 1 (2007–2008)

Season 2 (2008)

Season 3 (2009)
Notes: Season 3 began airing on TV9.

Awards
 Gold Award for The Best Use of Sponsorhip category at the 2008 MSA Malaysia Media Awards

References

External links
  (inactive)

Malaysian drama television series
2007 Malaysian television series debuts
2009 Malaysian television series endings
2000s Malaysian television series
TV3 (Malaysia) original programming
TV9 (Malaysia) original programming
Television shows set in Malaysia